Michael Healy (born 3 January 1978) is an Irish hurler who played as a full-back for the Galway senior team.

Healy made his first appearance for the team during the 1997 championship and was a regular member of the starting fifteen until his retirement after the 2000 championship. During that time he won three successive Connacht winners' medals. Healy was an All-Ireland runner-up on one occasion.

At club level Healy plays with the Castlegar.

References

1978 births
Living people
Castlegar hurlers
Galway inter-county hurlers
Connacht inter-provincial hurlers